= Italian Academy of Orthodontic Technology =

Accademia Italiana di Ortodonzia Tecnica
- Abbreviation: AIOT
- Type: Professional association
- Headquarters: Bologna
- Location: Italy
- Official language: Italian
- President: Stefano Pandolfi
- Key people: Sergio Paludetti (Secretary); Paolo Tedesco (Treasurer)

The Italian Academy of Orthodontic Technology (Italian: Accademia Italiana di Ortodonzia Tecnica (AIOT)) is a professional association for orthodontic technicians based in Italy.

== Council ==
The academy is run by a council, whose current members include Stefano Pandolfi (president), Sergio Paludetti (secretary), and Paolo Tedesco (treasurer).

== Annual congress ==
Each year, the AIOT holds a national congress alongside that of the Italian Academy of Orthodontics (Accademia Italiana di Ortodonzia, AIDOR) in a major Italian city such as Rome, Florence or Bologna.

The academy also holds a congress alongside the Italian Association of Orthodontic Specialists (Associazione Specialisti Italiani Ortodonzia, ASIO) congress.
